The following is a list of the top goal scorers in the TT Pro League since its inception in 1999. In each season, the top ten goal scorers are listed with their respective number of goals and club(s). Although incomplete statistics and goal scoring records exist for the 1999 through 2003–04 seasons, a list of the known top ten goal scorers are provided. If there are six or more players tied for tenth position in a season, then the players are excluded from the list.

Arnold Dwarika and Nigel Pierre became the first Pro League goal scorers to record ten or more goals in consecutive seasons between 1999 and 2000. One season later, Rolston James joined the duo to become the third Pro League goal scorer to record ten or more goals in consecutive seasons during 2000 and 2001. However, Saint Lucian Earl Jean of W Connection became the first player to achieve ten or more goals in three consecutive seasons in 2005–07, which included a share of the Golden Boot in 2005 with 14 goals. However, following the 2010–11 season, Devorn Jorsling became the first Pro League player to score ten or more goals in four consecutive seasons from 2007–11.

In addition, Nigel Pierre became the first player to finish in the top ten goal scorers in three consecutive seasons from 1999–2001. Kenwyne Jones later became the second player after the Trinidad and Tobago international scored 9, 18, and 12 goals respectively during the 2002–04 seasons. Moreover, Anthony Wolfe became the third to finish in the top ten scorers for three consecutive seasons from 2004–06. Devorn Jorsling later became the first player to finish in the top ten goal scorers in eight consecutive seasons after having earned the achievement in the 2007–14 seasons. In addition, Jorsling also holds the milestone of having finished in the top ten goal scorers on eight separate occasions.

On four separate occasions, five of the top ten positions in league scoring were held by foreign players. The first occurrence was in 2000 when Keith Gumbs (Saint Kitts and Nevis), José Maria Manoel and Gefferson (Brazil), Earl Jean (Saint Lucia), and Kendall Velox (Saint Vincent and the Grenadines) were among the top goal scorers in the league season. On the other hand, 2010–11 saw all ten top scorers for the season originate from Trinidad and Tobago for the first time, which was repeated in 2011–12, 2013–14, and 2015–16.

Top scorers by season

Appearances in top scorers by season

Multiple appearances

See also
 TT Pro League Golden Boot
 List of TT Pro League players with 100 or more goals
 List of TT Pro League seasons

References

External links
Official Website
Soca Warriors Online, TT Pro League

goal
TT Pro League records and statistics
Trinidad
Trinidad
Association football player non-biographical articles